"Lighthouse" is a single by English musician Lucy Spraggan. The song was released in the United Kingdom as a digital download on 28 June 2013 as the lead single from her debut studio album. The song was written by Lucy Spraggan, James Flannigan and the Ordinary Boys frontman Preston. The song has peaked to number 26 on the UK Singles Chart.

Background
The song was inspired by a journey Spraggan made across America at the age of 18 with just her guitar and a three-month Visa, Spraggan said, "Lighthouses are my good omen. When I was in the US and stuff went wrong, when I'd miss the last bus or I'd run out of money, I'd always see a lighthouse on a piece of paper, beer bottle or in real life then things would start getting better."

Live performances
On 15 July 2013, Spraggan performed the song live on BBC Breakfast.

Music video
A music video to accompany the release of "Lighthouse" was first released onto YouTube on 22 May 2013 at a total length of three minutes and twenty-two seconds. The video shows Lucy performing the track in a rehearsal space, while other scenes see her wandering around the city at dusk.

Track listing

Chart performance

Weekly charts

Release history

References

2013 singles
Lucy Spraggan songs
2013 songs
Columbia Records singles
Songs written by James Flannigan (songwriter)